Jean Renaux (25 June 1933 – 11 February 2018) was a French sports shooter. He competed at the 1960 Summer Olympics and the 1964 Summer Olympics.

References

1933 births
2018 deaths
French male sport shooters
Olympic shooters of France
Shooters at the 1960 Summer Olympics
Shooters at the 1964 Summer Olympics
Sportspeople from Marseille
20th-century French people